The following is a list of notable deaths in January 1998.

Entries for each day are listed alphabetically by surname. A typical entry lists information in the following sequence:
 Name, age, country of citizenship at birth, subsequent country of citizenship (if applicable), reason for notability, cause of death (if known), and reference.

January 1998

1
John F. Bateman, 83, American football player and coach.
Piero Filippone, 86, Italian art director.
Jack Forsey, 84, Canadian ice hockey player.
Dennis Hatsell, 67, English football player.
Alfred Lagarde, 49, Dutch radio personality, stroke.
Haxhi Lleshi, 84, Albanian military leader and communist politician.
Xanthe Ryder, 71, British alpine skier and Olympian.
Åke Seyffarth, 78, Swedish speed skater and road cyclist.
Helen Wills Moody, 92, American tennis player.

2
Max Colpet, 92, American writer, scriptwriter and lyricist.
Sergei Frolov, 73, Soviet/Russian realist painter and graphic artist.
Virginia Galante Garrone, 91, Italian writer.
Donald McCormick, 86, British journalist and popular historian.
Frank Muir, 77, English comedy writer and radio and television personality.
Fred Naumetz, 75, American gridiron football player.
Rell Sunn, 47, American World surfing champion, cancer.
Nick Venet, 61, American record producer, Burkitt's lymphoma.

3
Wayne Ambler, 82, American baseball player.
Essie Coffey, 56, Australian Aboriginal community leader.
Howard Gilman, 73, American philanthropist and art collector, heart attack.
William Russell Kelly, 92, American businessman, cancer.
Margot Lumb, 85, English squash and tennis player.
George Shaw, 64, American gridiron football player.
Geoffrey Watson, 76, Australian statistician.

4
Carlo Ludovico Bragaglia, 103, Italian film director, complications from a fall.
Raymond Léopold Bruckberger, 90, French Dominican priest, writer, and screenwriter.
Thomas F. Frist, Sr., 87, American physician and businessman.
John Gary, 65, American singer, recording artist, and television host.
Roland Kaiser, 54, German actor and voice actor.
Ahmed Mohiuddin, 74, Pakistani scientist and scholar.
Giuseppe Primavera, 80, Italian chess player.
Sally Purcell, 53, British poet and translator, lymphoma of brain cells.
Mae Questel, 89, American actress (Betty Boop), Alzheimer's disease.
Francisco Soc Rodrigo, 83, Filipino playwright, broadcaster, lawyer and politician.
Rudy Sikich, 76, American gridiron football player.
Yusif Yusifov, 68, Soviet and Azerbaijani linguist and historian.

5
Hugo Avendaño, 70, Mexican singer and actor, pancreatic cancer.
David Bairstow, 46, English cricketer, suicide.
Sonny Bono, 62, American singer-songwriter, actor and politician, skiing accident.
Alik Cavaliere, 71, Italian sculptor.
Ana Cortés, 102, Chilean painter.
Ken Forssi, 54, American musician, brain tumor, brain cancer.
Roy Mayne, 62, American stock car racing driver.

6
Walt Barnes, 79, American football player and actor, diabetes.
Richard Clutterbuck, 80, British army general and military historian.
Otello Colangeli, 85, Italian film editor.
Jack T. Conway, 80, American labor unionist.
Alice Frost, 87, American actress.
Victorine du Pont Homsey, 97, American architect.
Murray Salem, 47, American television actor and screenwriter, AIDS-related complications.
Otto Schmitt, 84, American inventor, engineer and biophysicist.
Georgy Sviridov, 82, Soviet and Russian composer, heart attack.

7
Owen Bradley, 82, American musician and record producer.
Roger Dean, 84, Australian politician.
Jacqueline deWit, 85, American actress.
Richard Hamming, 82, American mathematician, heart attack.
Dorothy Leavey, 101, American philanthropist.
Alva Liles, 41, American gridiron football player.
Slava Metreveli, 61, Soviet and Georgian football player and manager.
Valerio Perentin, 88, Italian rower and Olympian.
Vladimir Prelog, 91, Croatian-Swiss organic chemist.
Frank Roberts, 90, British diplomat.
Lawrence Treat, 94, American mystery writer.
Tere Velázquez, 55, Mexican actress, colorectal cancer.
Dorothy Wilson, 88, American film actress.

8
Doug Anderson, 70, Canadian ice hockey player.
Bill Corbus, 86, American gridiron football player.
Walter Diemer, 94, American inventor of bubble gum, congestive heart failure.
Marie-Madeleine Dienesch, 83, French politician.
Tony Lavelli, 71, American basketball player and musician, heart attack.
Denys Lombard, 59, French historian and sinologist.
Akihiko Mori, 32, Japanese video game music composer, cancer.
Max Morris, 72, American basketball and gridiron football player.
Sam Perrin, 96, American screenwriter.
Shamima Shaikh, 37, South African journalist and Muslim women's rights activist, breast cancer.
Raziuddin Siddiqui, 90, Pakistan-born American physicist.
Michael Tippett, 90, English composer, pneumonia.

9
Hugo Zepeda Barrios, 90, Chilean politician and lawyer.
Paul H. Dunn, 73, American Mormon leader.
Kenichi Fukui, 79, Japanese chemist and Nobel Prize laureate, cancer.
Alberto Isaac, 74, Mexican swimmer, film director and screenwriter.
Imi Lichtenfeld, 87, Israeli martial artist.
Lia Manoliu, 65, Romanian discus thrower and Olympian, heart attack.
Kathleen Shannon, 62, Canadian film director and producer, lung cancer.
Charito Solis, 62, Filipino film actress, cardiac arrest.

10
Deng Guangming, 90, Chinese historian, cancer.
Wolfgang Hahn, 86, German mathematician.
Mona May Karff, 83, American chess player.
Victor Papanek, 74, Austrian-American designer.
Mario Santiago Papasquiaro, 44, Mexican poet, traffic accident.

11
Joe Becker, 89, American baseball player.
Erik Jarvik, 90, Swedish paleontologist.
Win Mortimer, 78, Canadian comic book and comic strip artist, cancer.
Ellis Rabb, 67, American actor and director, heart failure.
Ronald Rylance, 73, English rugby player.
Aydan Siyavuş, 50, Turkish basketball player and coach, heart attack.
Bedri Spahiu, 89, Albanian politician and general.
Klaus Tennstedt, 71, German conductor, cancer.
Georgi Vins, 69, Soviet dissident and Baptist pastor.
John Wells, 61, English actor, writer and satirist.

12
Florence Riefle Bahr, 88, American artist and activist, domestic accident.
Ramón Sampedro Cameán, 55, Spanish writer and euthanasia activist, suicide.
Roger Clark, 58, British rally driver, stroke.
Mark MacGuigan, 66, Canadian academic and politician, liver cancer.
Libuše Moníková, 52, Czech writer.
Ian Moores, 43, English footballer, cancer.
Phyllis Nelson, 47, American singer, breast cancer.
Robert Townsend, 77, American businessman and author, heart attack.

13
Martin Flämig, 84, German church musician.
Mihovil Logar, 95, Yugoslav composer and music writer.
Bob Martin, 75, Austrian singer.
Muslim Mulliqi, Albanian painter.
Andrew Rutherford, 68, British educationalist.

14
Safiye Ayla, 90, Turkish classical singer.
Tony De Vita, 65, Italian composer, conductor, arranger and pianist.
Arturo Enrile, 57, Filipino general, septic shock.
Mohammad Ghazi, 84, Iranian writer and translator and writer, laryngeal cancer.
Harry Simmons, 90, American baseball executive, writer and historian.

15
John A. Anderson, 65, American football coach, heart attack.
Hal Baylor, 79, American actor.
Marcelline Jayakody, 95, Sri Lankan Catholic priest, musician, author, journalist.
Gennady Kolbin, 70, Soviet politician.
Marguerite Kuczynski, 93, European economist and literary scholar.
Duncan McNaughton, 87, Canadian athlete and Olympian.
Gulzarilal Nanda, 99, Indian politician and economist.
E. Jack Neuman, 76, American writer and producer.
Ahmed Oudjani, 60, Algerian football player.
William George Pottinger, 81, British convicted fraudster.
Boris Tatushin, 64, Soviet football player and manager.
Harriet Van Horne, 77, American newspaper columnist and radio/television critic, breast cancer.
Junior Wells, 63, American blues vocalist and harmonica player, lymphoma.

16
Gayane C'ebotaryan, 79, Armenian composer and musicologist.
Hans Grünberg, 80, German Luftwaffe fighter ace during World War II.
Dimitris Horn, 76, Greek-Austrian actor, cancer.
Matti Kuusi, 83, Finnish folklorist, paremiographer and paremiologist.
Lorenzo Mongiardino, 81, Italian architect and interior designer, pneumonia.
Tommy Pederson, 77, American jazz trombonist and composer.
Emil Sitka, 83, American actor, stroke.
Luggi Waldleitner, 84, German film producer.

17
Alan E. Cober, 62, American illustrator.
Zygmunt Czyżewski, 87, Polish ice hockey and football player and manager.
Helvi Hämäläinen, 90, Finnish writer.
Junior Kimbrough, 67, American blues musician, heart attack.
Joseph S. Murphy, 64, American political scientist and university administrator, car accident.
Cliffie Stone, 80, American musician and radio and TV personality.
Luís Trochillo, 67, Brazilian football player.

18
Byron Bailey, 67, American gridiron and Canadian football player.
Joan Banks, 79, American actress, lung cancer.
Jose Calugas, 90, Filipino-American Philippine Scout and recipient of the Medal of Honor.
Guy Charbonneau, 75, Canadian politician.
Maria Judite de Carvalho, 76, Portuguese author.
Monica Edwards, 85, English children's writer.
Dan Georgiadis, 75, Greek football player and manager.
Antoine "T.C.D." Lundy, 34, American singer, ALS.
Gerry Ottenheimer, 63, Canadian politician.
Benjamin Hoskins Paddock, 71, American bank robber and con man, FBI Ten Most Wanted Fugitive, heart attack.
Skeets Quinlan, 69, American gridiron football player.
Wilhelm Törsleff, 91, Swedish sailor and Olympian.
Josip Uhač, 73, Yugoslav-Croatian Apostolic nuncio.
James Villiers, 64, English actor, cancer.

19
Bengt Eklund, 73, Swedish actor.
Cornelis Kalkman, 69, Dutch botanist.
Al Negratti, 76, American basketball player and coach, cancer.
David Orlikow, 79, Canadian politician.
Carl Perkins, 65, American singer-songwriter, esophageal cancer.
Abraham Sinkov, 90, American cryptanalyst.
DeWitt Weaver, 85, American football player and coach.

20
Harry Ashmore, 81, American journalist.
Bobo Brazil, 73, American professional wrestler, known as "Bobo Brazil", stroke.
Jacob Cohen, 74, American psychologist and statistician.
Zevulun Hammer, 61, Israeli politician, cancer.

21
Mary Bunting, 87, American academic and college president;.
Edward Carrick, 93, English art designer, author and illustrator.
Larry Gilbert, 55, American golfer, lung cancer.
Pakoda Kadhar, 58, Indian actor.
Friedrich Kessler, 96, American law professor.
Yoshifumi Kondō, 47, Japanese animator (Kiki's Delivery Service, Princess Mononoke) and film director (Whisper of the Heart), aortic dissection.
Jack Lord, 77, American actor (Hawaii Five-O, Dr. No, Stoney Burke), congestive heart failure.
Ralph C. Smith, 104, United States Army officer, lung ailment.
Louis Thiétard, 87, French cyclist.

22
C. Elmer Anderson, 85, American politician.
Edward F. Arn, 91, American lawyer and politician.
Hendrick Joseph Cornelius Maria de Cocq, 91, Dutch Roman Catholic bishop.
Harold Lindsell, 84, American evangelical author and scholar.
George Marks, 82, English football player.
Nino Pirrotta, 89, Italian musicologist.
Bill Sortet, 85, American gridiron football player.

23
Donald Davis, 69, Canadian actor.
John Forbes, 47, Australian poet.
Friedrich Josias, Prince of Saxe-Coburg and Gotha, 79, German nobleman.
Ralf Kirsten, 67, German film director and screenwriter.
Hilla Limann, 63, President of Ghana, diabetes.
Roy McKasson, 58, American football player, kidney transplant complications.
Alfredo Ormando, 39, Italian writer and gay rights activist, burns from self-immolation.
Victor Pasmore, 89, British artist and architect.
Ernest Peirce, 88, South African boxer.
Sajjad Hussain Qureshi, 101, Indian politician.
Lionel Wilson, 82, American politician, cancer.
Mohammad Yusuf, 81, Prime Minister of Afghanistan.

24
Nodar Akhalkatsi, 60, Georgian football manager, heart attack.
Walter Bishop Jr., 70, American jazz pianist, heart attack.
Walter D. Edmonds, 94, American writer, .
Mirosław Justek, 49, Polish football player.
Bob Russell, 90, American entertainer .
Elizabeth Sneyers, 84, Belgian lawyer and feminist.
Justin Tubb, 62, American country music singer and songwriter.

25
Hamid Algadri, 85, Indonesian independence pioneer.
Olive Brasno, 80, American dwarf dancer and actress.
Sidney Cole, 89, British film and television producer.
Dilawar Figar, 68, Pakistani writer, poet, and humorist.
Attia Hosain, 85, British-Indian novelist, author, journalist and actor.
Fritz Langner, 85, German football player and manager.
Roy Porter, 74, American jazz drummer.
Herman Stokes, 65, American athlete and Olympian.
Attila Zoller, 70, Hungary-American jazz guitarist.

26
Hogan Bassey, 65, Nigerian-British boxer.
Lord Nicholas Hervey, 36, British aristocrat and political activist, suicide by hanging.
Olaf Kortner, 77, Norwegian politician.
Ethelreda Leopold, 83, American film actress, pneumonia.
Lee Moses, 56, American R&B and soul singer and guitarist, lung cancer.
Mario Schifano, 63, Italian painter and collagist.
Shin'ichi Suzuki, 99, Japanese musician, philosopher and educator.

27
Alan Davies, 73, British air marshal.
Tamio Kageyama, 50, Japanese novelist, house fire, accident.
Elizabeth Mantell, 56, Scottish midwife and nurse.
Assia Noris, 85, Russian-Italian film actress.
Mykola Mykolaĭovych Shcherbak, 70, Soviet-Ukrainian zoologist, ecologist, and herpetologist.
Geoffrey Trease, 88, British writer.
Miklos Udvardy, 78, Hungarian biologist and biogeographer.

28
Louis Chaillot, 83, French cyclist and Olympian.
Bernard Joseph Flanagan, 89, American prelate of the Roman Catholic Church.
Joe Holup, 63, American basketball player.
Shōtarō Ishinomori, 60, Japanese manga artist, "Father of Henshin heroes", heart failure.
Ken Jackson, 68, American gridiron football player.
Dagny Tande Lid, 94, Norwegian painter, illustrator and poet.
Lee Ya-Ching, 85, Chinese film actress, aviator and philanthropist.

29
Joseph Alioto, 81, American politician, Mayor of San Francisco, prostate cancer.
Ugo Bologna, 80, Italian actor and voice actor, heart attack.
Karin Jonzen, 83, British figure sculptor.
Rob Mulders, 30, Dutch road racing cyclist, car crash.
Ed Smith, 84, American gridiron football player (Boston Redskins, Green Bay Packers).

30
Jim Barber, 85, American gridiron football player (Boston Redskins, Washington Redskins).
Héctor Campos-Parsi, 75, Puerto Rican composer.
Richard Cassilly, 70, American operatic tenor, cerebral hemorrhage after fall.
Samuel Eilenberg, 84, Polish-American mathematician.
Pappanamkodu Lakshmanan, 61, Indian film director, scriptwriter and lyricist.
Ferdy Mayne, 81, German-British actor, Parkinson's disease.
Lesslie Newbigin, 88, British theologian, missionary and author.
Emmette Redford, 93, American political scientist.
Luise Walker, 87, Austrian classical guitarist and composer.

31
Greta Arwidsson, 91, Swedish archaeologist.
Georges Combret, 91, French film director, producer and screenwriter.
Leho Laurine, 93, Estonian chess master.
Alice Miel, 91, American educator.
Karol Stryja, 82, Polish conductor and teacher.

References 

1998-01
 01